Amphorella is a genus of air-breathing land snails, terrestrial pulmonate gastropod mollusks in the family Ferussaciidae.

Species
The genus Amphorella contains the following species:
 Amphorella cimensis
 Amphorella iridescens
 Amphorella melampoides
 Amphorella producta
 † Amphorella talaverai Hutterer & Groh, 2014

References

Ferussaciidae
Taxonomy articles created by Polbot